Linh is a Vietnamese name that means "soul" or "spirit". It is the Vietnamese pronunciation of the Chinese character  (líng), which is not used as a surname in China.

Surname
 Linh Quang Viên (1918-2013), Vietnamese soldier who rose to the rank of Lieutenant General in the Army of the Republic of Vietnam

Fictional characters 

 Chase Linh, from Need for Speed: Undercover

Given name
 Linh, the fictitious Vietnamese-American woman played by Hong Chau, whom Sonny courts then marries, in the HBO TV series Treme
 Linh Dinh (Vietnamese Đinh Linh, born 1963) Vietnamese-American poet, fiction writer, translator, and photographer
 Chế Linh, Vietnamese pop singer of Cham origin
 Linh Nga (full name Nguyễn Linh Nga, born 1982), Vietnamese actress

See also
 Ling (surname)

References

Vietnamese-language surnames